Clara Christiana Morgan Chapin (nicknames, Mom Chape and La Petite; pen name, Clara English; 1852 – 1926) was a British-born American woman suffragist, temperance worker, and editor.

Early years and education
Clara Christiana Morgan was born in Gloucestershire, England, December 26, 1852. Her father was of Welsh origins, and her mother came of an old country family, the Blagdons, proprietors of the manor of Boddington since the days of William the Conqueror.

She was educated in Clifton Ladies' College and passed the Cambridge local examination, the only form of university privilege open at that time to girls. She came to the United States with her parents and their five younger children in 1870. The family settled in Fillmore County, Nebraska.

In Fillmore county, Chapin engaged in teaching. In September, 1872, she married Clarence C. Chapin, of Sheffield, Massachusetts, and shortly after, they removed to Franklin County, Nebraska, where both took a prominent part in the development of the new State of Nebraska. Mr. Chapin served as a member of the Nebraska State Legislature, while his wife, by the use of her pen and personal influence, aided in securing the enactment of the Slocum license law, at that time supposed to be the panacea in temperance matters. They also aided materially in securing the temperance educational and scientific law for that State. She was particularly interested in all movements for the advancement of women and took an active part in the woman suffrage campaign of 1882. She was a prominent member of the Woman's Christian Temperance Union and wrote much for the press on the woman and temperance questions. She served as editor of The Union Signal, an organ of the Woman's Temperance Publishing Association, from 1874. Chapin's used the pen name, "Clara English".

Being a small woman, Chapin commonly went by the name "La Petite" among her co-workers in Nebraska. Though of English birth, Chapin's life-work was in the United States. She resided, with her husband, son and two daughters, in one of the suburban towns of Chicago, Illinois. 
 She died in November 1926 in Los Angeles, California.

References

Attribution

Bibliography

External links
 

1852 births
1926 deaths
People from Gloucestershire (before 1904)
American suffragists
Woman's Christian Temperance Union people
Women newspaper editors
American newspaper editors
19th-century American non-fiction writers
19th-century American women writers
19th-century English writers
19th-century British women writers
19th-century British writers
American women non-fiction writers